The Iceland Crisis Response Unit (ICRU; Icelandic: Íslenska Friðargæslan) is an Icelandic para-military unit with a capacity roster of up to 200 people, of whom about 30 are active at any given time. It is operated by the Icelandic Ministry of Foreign Affairs. It is primarily designated for peacekeeping operations and was established in the 1990s to participate in operations and peacekeeping projects, including in support of NATO peacekeeping operations. That role later evolved into providing an appropriate forum for deploying personnel within other organizations such as with OSCE field missions as well as with UN DPKO, and organizations such as UNIFEM, UNRWA and UNICEF.

The ICRU personnel has been deployed to the former territories of Yugoslavia, Kosovo and Afghanistan through NATO missions and UNIFEM and to the Middle East and North Africa with UNICEF, UNRWA and UNHCR. It had a civilian observer mission in Sri Lanka in co-operation with Norway (previously a Nordic mission) and has explosive ordnance disposal personnel from the Icelandic Coast Guard to Lebanon and Iraq.

Iceland deployed its first peacekeepers in 1950, when two Icelandic police officers were sent to Palestine as a part of an UN peacekeeping operation. Though many Icelandic specialists have taken part in various peacekeeping operations since, mostly within the UN and its organizations but also within NATO, it was not until the 1990s that organized participation in peacekeeping operations was initiated, formalized with the establishment of the ICRU in 2001.

In 2008, a portion of uniformed ICRU deployed personnel still armed for self-defense returned their weapons and changed to civilian clothing. The policy since 2008, is that, unless under special circumstances, ICRU personnel do not wear uniforms or carry weapons.

The Ministry for Foreign Affairs in Iceland oversees the roster and deployment of personnel.

Personnel
The deployed personnel of the ICRU were experts, including Icelandic policemen, Coast Guardsmen and others that had relative training for the concerned institutions. In addition to those mentioned above, these backgrounds range from logistical backgrounds, medical or engineering backgrounds, social sciences and so on. But now, after a law was passed in 2007 the "peacekeepers" need a college degree. In 2014, it's much more of an aid squad rather than peacekeepers.

The previously deployed doctors, nurses, those deployed as Provincial Reconstruction Teams (PRT) as well as those working at Kabul International Airport (KAIA) were trained by the Norwegian Armed Forces (previously the United Kingdom Armed Forces as well) as they were expected to merge into a military environment and the PRT's as well as those working at Kabul airport would be armed.

The ICRU roster members receive training and exercise in line with their deployment, but no military training from 2009. The legal basis for the ICRU is set in Icelandic law on ICRU, No. 73/2007

Operations
The ICRU classifies its operations in the following manner:

 Peacekeeping and Crisis management
 Observer missions
 Reconstruction
 Humanitarian and Emergency assistance

Intelligence gathering
The National Commissioner of Iceland is charged with intelligence gathering for national security purposes as well as expeditionary peacekeeping operations. The Defence Department of the Ministry for Foreign Affairs oversees military related intelligence and cooperation in that field.

Equipment

Vehicles
 &  24 Nissan Patrol armored and modified by Arctic Trucks for driving in mountainous terrain (PRT teams previously deployed in Afghanistan)
 Santana Anibal
 Iveco Trakker

Small arms
PRT teams previously deployed in Afghanistan as well as those previously working in Kabul International Airport were supplied with the weaponry and ammunition the military forces they are cooperating with use. The standard weaponry was in most cases however of Norwegian origin.

 /  Heckler & Koch G3/AG-3 battle rifle
 Glock 17 pistol
 Diemaco C8 assault rifle
 Heckler & Koch MP5 submachine gun
 FN Minimi light machine guns
 Rheinmetall MG3 general-purpose machine guns

Ranks of the Icelandic Crisis Response Unit

Officers

Enlisted

See also
Military of Iceland
Icelandic Coast Guard
Iceland Air Defence System

References

External links

Þátttaka Íslands í alþjóðlegri friðargæslu
Reykjavík Grapevine 2004 issue 8
Ársskýrsla Íslensku friðargæslunnar 2007 
Lög nr. 73 frá 2007 um Íslensku friðargæsluna 
Ársskýrsla Íslensku friðargæslunnar 2006 
Icelandic Ministry for Foreign Affairs website on the ICRU
ICRU Yearly report for 2007
Women, peace and security. ICRU and resolution 1325
ICRU personnel clear cluster bombs and other unexploded ordnance in southern Lebanon
ICRU in brief
ICRU contributes to Balkan stability

Defence of Iceland
1990s establishments in Iceland